Stolen Kisses is a 1929 American comedy film directed by Ray Enright and starring May McAvoy, Hallam Cooley and Reed Howes. It was made as a Part-talkie using the Vitaphone system.

Premise
A man interferes in his son's marriage to such an extent that he almost drives the couple to divorce.

Cast
 May McAvoy as May Lambert  
 Hallam Cooley as Hal Lambert  
 Reed Howes as Jack Harding  
 Claude Gillingwater as H.A. Lambert Sr.  
 Edna Murphy as Fanchon La Vere  
 Arthur Hoyt as Hoyt  
 Agnes Franey as Nanette  
 Phyllis Crane as Margot

Preservation status
The film is now lost.

See also
 List of early Warner Bros. sound and talking features

References

Bibliography
 Roy Liebman. Vitaphone Films: A Catalogue of the Features and Shorts. McFarland, 2003.

External links

 

1929 films
Films directed by Ray Enright
1929 comedy films
1920s English-language films
American black-and-white films
Silent American comedy films
Warner Bros. films
Lost American films
1929 lost films
Lost comedy films
1920s American films